Soest may refer to:

Places

Pronounced /ˈzoːst/
Soest, Germany 
Soest (district), a district around the location in Germany

Pronounced /ˈsust/
Soest, Netherlands

Other
Gerard Soest, British artist
SOEST, School of Ocean and Earth Science and Technology in Honolulu, Hawaii, USA